Jilem may refer to:

 Jilem (Havlíčkův Brod District), a village in the Vysočina Region, Czech Republic
 Jilem (Jindřichův Hradec District), a village in the South Bohemian Region, Czech Republic